Transylvania is a studio album released in 2009 by the Belgian alternative rock band Creature with the Atom Brain. It was described by Drowned in Sound as "a bit like Alien: Resurrection."

Track listing
All music by Creature with the Atom Brain, all lyrics by Aldo Struyf

 "I Rise the Moon" – 3:20
 "The Color of Sundown" – 4:32
 "Something Is Wrong" – 4:21
 "Transylvania" – 6:01
 "Lonely Light" – 5:25
 "Spinnin' the Black Hole" – 3:37
 "Darker Than a Dungeon" – 7:15
 "Sound of Confusion" – 3:06
 "Make Noise" – 3:01
 "The Lonesome Whistle" – 6:12

Personnel
Creature with the Atom Brain
 Aldo Struyf – guitar, vocals, engineer
 Michiel Van Cleuvenbergen – guitar
 Jan Wygers – bass
 Dave Schroyen – drums, percussion

Additional musicians
 Mark Lanegan – vocals on "Lonely Light"
 Koen Kohlbacher – vocals on "Lonely Light" and "Darker Than a Dungeon"
 Chris Goss – drum machine and backing vocals on "Lonely Light", mixing
 Pascal Deweze – keyboards, engineer

 Production
 Pieter Van Buyten – engineer
 Edmund Monsef – mixing engineer
 John Golden – mastering

References

External links
 "Transylvania CD", Creature with the Atom Brain website

Creature with the Atom Brain albums
2009 albums
The End Records albums